Polygala setacea, commonly known as the coastal plain milkwort, is a flowering plant. A perennial, it lives for about three years and may not flower its first year. It grows in the southeastern United States. It has scale-like leaves and white flowers. It grows in flatwoods.

References

setacea